Nayana Doletta Ferguson (born 1973) is an African-American businesswoman. Co-founder and CEO of Anteel Tequila, she is the first Black woman to own and run a tequila company.

Life 
Ferguson was born and grew up in Detroit, Michigan. She graduated from Cass Technical High School. Ferguson later had a career in business before launching Anteel Tequila (previously known as Teeq Tequila) in August 2018 with her husband Don Ferguson in Detroit. The company's name was inspired by the Antillean Crested hummingbird, which Ferguson and her husband saw on their honeymoon in the Dominican Republic. The couple and company moved to Atlanta around 2022. Ferguson's Anteel Tequila products have received numerous industry awards, including SIP Awards, and the San Francisco World Spirits Competition. 

Ferguson promoted her company as a featured guest on The Kelly Clarkson Show on February 17, 2022.

Health
Ferguson was diagnosed with pancreatic cancer in 2005 and with breast cancer in 2012. She was involved with PanCan Detroit affiliate of volunteers which is connected with the Pancreatic Cancer Action Network.

References 

Date of birth missing (living people) 
1973 births
Businesspeople from Detroit
African-American businesspeople
African-American women in business
21st-century American businesspeople
21st-century African-American women
Cass Technical High School alumni
Living people